Rehearsals for Retirement is Phil Ochs's sixth album, released in 1969 on A&M Records.

Background
Recorded in the aftermath of Ochs's presence at the 1968 Democratic National Convention in Chicago (where Ochs claimed to have witnessed the symbolic "death of America") it is often considered to be the darkest of Ochs's albums, exemplified not just by the lyrical matter but also by its cover: a tombstone sardonically proclaiming that Ochs had died in Chicago.

Rehearsals for Retirement saw Ochs exploring folk rock, incorporating orchestral accompaniments and electric guitar into his music. According to English studies scholar David Pichaske, songs such as "Pretty Smart on My Part" and "The Scorpion Departs but Never Returns" functioned as "art-protest songs". The former was written from the perspective of a John Birch Society member who is paranoid of switchblade-toting thieves, foreign operatives, dissident hitchhikers, and dominant, large-breasted women, and acts on this paranoia by killing them and others with a rifle and his friends from the National Rifle Association of America (NRA). Pichaske interpreted the narrative as a psychological analysis finding insecurity to be the source of violence in the United States. The latter song used the 1968 disappearance of the Scorpion nuclear submarine as an allegory for a modern "Lost Generation" who abandon the U.S. in response to the Vietnam War.

Reception

Rehearsals for Retirement was the poorest-selling of all of Ochs's albums released during his lifetime, having been deleted from the A&M Records catalog before sales of 20,000 units had occurred.

Reviewing for The Village Voice in 1969, Robert Christgau said the musical arrangements are "excellent and work for [Ochs'] voice". While observing "some predictable bummers", Christgau highlighted two flashes of greatness with "The Scorpion Departs But Never Returns" and "Another Age".

In 1998, The Wire included Rehearsals for Retirement in their list of "100 Records That Set the World on Fire (While No One Was Listening)", where the staff praised it "the single most eloquent collection of protest songs in the English language." They further described it as a song cycle where "the political gives way to the existential", with a combination of "angry disillusion and impassioned optimism" that is "entirely disarming." William Ruhlmann, in a retrospective review for AllMusic, felt the album imbued Ochs' poetic sense with "the conflicts of the times", and noted how, with regard to Ochs' 1976 suicide, "it is impossible not to see the evidence of the songwriter's personal anguish in Rehearsals for Retirement.

Track listing
All songs by Phil Ochs.

Side one
 "Pretty Smart on My Part" – 3:18
 "The Doll House" – 4:39
 "I Kill Therefore I Am" – 2:55
 "William Butler Yeats Visits Lincoln Park and Escapes Unscathed" - 2:55
 [Untitled] (commonly called "Where Were You in Chicago?") – 0:29
 "My Life"  – 3:12

Side two
 "The Scorpion Departs but Never Returns" – 4:15
 "The World Began in Eden and Ended in Los Angeles" – 3:06
 "Doesn't Lenny Live Here Anymore?" – 6:11
 "Another Age" – 3:42
 "Rehearsals for Retirement" – 4:09

Personnel
Phil Ochs – guitar, vocals
Larry Marks – producer
Lincoln Mayorga – piano, accordion
Bob Rafkin – guitar, bass
Kevin Kelley – drums (rumored)
Ian Freebairn-Smith – arrangements

References

Further reading

External links

1969 albums
Phil Ochs albums
A&M Records albums
Albums recorded at A&M Studios